Dominique V. Turpin (born 12 January 1957, in Tours), a marketing professor at the International Institute for Management Development (IMD) with research interests in brand management, marketing strategy and communications.

He spent his childhood and adolescence in France and obtained his baccalaureate of Sciences with distinction in 1976. He studied at ESSCA from 1976 to 1980 and as part of his curriculum he spent an academic year at the Universidad Autónoma de Madrid to study political marketing. Subsequently, he earned his doctorate in economics from Sophia University in Tokyo (1986). Professor Turpin has been honoured famous alumnus of Sofia university and is an alumnus of the IMD "International Program for Board Members".

Between 1986 and 1991 Dominique Turpin was successively appointed Post-Doctorate Fellow and Assistant Professor at IMEDE in Switzerland and Visiting Professor at Keio Business School in Japan. He became a full professor IMD in 1991, and he was President of IMD from July 2010 to December 2016. He succeeded John R. Wells and was succeeded by Jean-Francois Manzoni

Professional Activities 
Dominique Turpin aims to provide executive education and perspectives for global leaders.

Professor Turpin has directed some of IMD's program offerings, including its top-ranked MBA (Master of Business Administration) and its PED (Program for Executive Development). He was the co-Program Director of the IMD's Orchestrating Winning Performance (OWP). He has pioneered programs in Singapore and Brazil, as well as in China and Japan. He has directed customized programs for companies such as Groupe SEB, Panasonic and Japan Tobacco International. He has worked as a consultant and management educator with a large number of international companies including: Coca-Cola, CPW, Danone, DSM, Jardine Matheson, Nestlé, Novo Nordisk, Philips and Uponor.

Dominique Turpin has been a regular contributor to the Nihon Sangyo Shimbun (The Japan Industrial Journal), one of the leading business dailies in Japan. He is an editorial advisor of the Singapore Management Review and the Continental European editor for the Long Range Planning Journal as well as The International Journal of Strategic Management. Between 1997 and 1999, Professor Turpin served as a Board Member of ITOCHU, a leading Japanese trading company, and was elected member of the International Academy of Management in 2000. Since 1994, he serves as the IMD representative on the Academic Council of the China-Europe International Business School (CEIBS) in Shanghai (People's Republic of China).

In 2001 and 2002, Professor Turpin was awarded Best European Case Writing (EFMD). Since 2002, he has held the IMD Dentsu professorship in Japanese management. His current research focuses on brand management, and he has been widely published in more than 100 books, articles and case studies including the Financial Times, European Business Forum and MIT Sloan Management Review.

Being a prolific case writer, Turpin has also featured among the top 40 case authors, since the list was first published in 2016 by The Case Centre. He ranked 39th in 2018/19 and 33rd in 2015/16.

Turpin also featured on the list of The Case Centre's all-time top authors list (covering 40 years) released in 2014.

Personal 
Dominique Turpin is married and has three children. He speaks English, French, Japanese and Spanish.

References

External links 
 
Dominique Turpin's FT video interview  
The Financial Times, 17 July 2011, "Eager to stand out from the crowd", by Della Bradshaw

1957 births
Living people
Businesspeople from Tours, France
French business theorists
Business educators
Bestselling case authors